Qué Alegría is an album by the John McLaughlin Trio, featuring percussionist Trilok Gurtu and bass guitarist Dominique Di Piazza.
Di Piazza is replaced by Kai Eckhardt on two tracks. It was released on the Verve label in 1992. The album reached 1992 number 5 in the Billboard Top Contemporary Jazz Albums chart.

Reception
Allmusic awarded the album with 3 stars and its review by Richard S. Ginell states: "McLaughlin sounds rejuvenated and refreshed in this format, as he switches between acoustic guitar and a guitar synthesizer attachment that softens and rounds his attacks while creating some luminous timbres and textures. McLaughlin's on-again, off-again Indian kick rises prominently into view here as Trilok Gurtu's role broadens into that of an all-purpose percussionist, producing some amazing sounds as backdrops".

Track listing
All compositions by John McLaughlin except where noted.

"Belo Horizonte" – 6:35
"Baba" (Trilok Gurtu) – 6:51
"Reincarnation" – 11:52
"1 Nite Stand" – 5:25
"Marie" (Dominique Di Piazza) – 1:59
"Hijacked" – 8:35
"Mila Repa" – 7:31
"Qué Alegría" – 10:32
"3 Willows" – 5:14

Personnel
John McLaughlin – acoustic guitar, Photon Midi interface
Trilok Gurtu – percussion
Dominique Di Piazza – 4 string and 5 string bass guitars
Kai Eckhardt – bass guitar on "Reincarnation" and "1 Nite Stand"

Charts

References

1991 albums
John McLaughlin (musician) albums
Trilok Gurtu albums
Verve Records albums